This article contains the results of the Republic of Ireland national football team between 2000 and 2009.

2000

2001

2002

2003

2004

2005

2006

2007

2008

2009

Notes

References

2000–09
1999–2000 in Republic of Ireland association football
2000–01 in Republic of Ireland association football
2001–02 in Republic of Ireland association football
2002–03 in Republic of Ireland association football
2003 in Republic of Ireland association football
2004 in Republic of Ireland association football
2005 in Republic of Ireland association football
2006 in Republic of Ireland association football
2007 in Republic of Ireland association football
2008 in Republic of Ireland association football
2009 in Republic of Ireland association football